The Dark Man and Others is a posthumously-published anthology of fifteen short stories by American author Robert E. Howard, named after his short story "The Dark Man", and covering the genres of adventure fiction, horror, historical fiction, fantasy, sword and sorcery, weird fiction and the weird West. It was first published in 1963 by Arkham House, and was edited by August Derleth. Eleven of the stories had previously been published in the pulp magazine Weird Tales, and one each in Argosy, Oriental Stories and Strange Tales. It was reprinted in 1971 as a paperback by Lancer.

Contents

 Introduction, by August Derleth
 The Voice of El-Lil
 Pigeons from Hell
 The Dark Man
 The Gods of Bal-Sagoth
 People of the Dark
 The Children of the Night
 The Dead Remember
 The Man on the Ground
 The Garden of Fear
 The Thing on the Roof
 The Hyena
 Dig Me No Grave
 The Dream Snake
 In the Forest of Villefère
 Old Garfield's Heart

Bibliography

Chalker, Jack L. (1998). The Science-Fantasy Publishers. Mirage Press.
Jaffery, Sheldon (1989). The Arkham House Companion. Starmont House. 
Joshi, S. T. (1999). Sixty Years of Arkham House compiled by S. T. Joshi. Arkham House. 
Nielsen, Leon (2004). Arkham House Books: A Collector's Guide. McFarland & Company.

References

1963 short story collections
1971 short story collections
Fantasy short story collections
Short story collections by Robert E. Howard
Arkham House books